This is a list of mayors and the later lord mayors of the city of Bradford.

After having elected a mayor since 1847 Bradford was awarded the dignity of a Lord Mayoralty by letters patent dated 16 September 1907. At the time, it was the seventh most populous borough in England and Wales, and the second largest in area, and thus the largest municipality without a Lord Mayor. When Bradford became a metropolitan borough in 1974 the honour was confirmed by letters patent dated 1 April 1974.

Mayors of Bradford

Source:

Lord mayors of Bradford

See also
 Timeline of Bradford

References

Bradford, Lord Mayors of the City of
 
Lord Mayors
Lord Mayors